Barbara Engleder (née Lechner; born 16 September 1982, in Eggenfelden) is a German rifle shooter. She competed in the 50 m rifle three positions event at the 2012 Summer Olympics, where she placed 6th in the final. She won gold at the 50 m rifle three positions event at the 2016 Summer Olympics

References

External links 
 
 
 
 

1982 births
Living people
German female sport shooters
Olympic shooters of Germany
Shooters at the 2004 Summer Olympics
Shooters at the 2008 Summer Olympics
Shooters at the 2012 Summer Olympics
Shooters at the 2016 Summer Olympics
Shooters at the 2015 European Games
European Games bronze medalists for Germany
European Games medalists in shooting
Medalists at the 2016 Summer Olympics
Olympic gold medalists for Germany
Olympic medalists in shooting
People from Eggenfelden
Sportspeople from Lower Bavaria
21st-century German women